Return of the Product is the only solo studio album by former 3rd Bass member MC Serch. It was released August 25, 1992 on Def Jam Recordings and Columbia Records. Recording sessions took place at Chung King Studios in New York City, at Chapel Studios and Red Chamber Studios in Los Angeles through November 1991 to July 1992. Production was handled by T-Ray, Skeff Anselm, Epic Mazur and Richard Wolf, with MC Serch serving as executive and co-producer. It features guest appearances from Chubb Rock, Joe Fatal, Nas and Red Hot Lover Tone.

The album peaked at number 103 on the Billboard 200, at number 28 on the Top R&B/Hip-Hop Albums and at number 2 on the Heatseekers Albums in the United States. Return of the Product spawned a hit single "Back to the Grill Again", which reached number 1 on the Hot Rap Singles chart. The title of "Back to the Grill Again" is a reference to the 3rd Bass track "Kick 'Em in the Grill".

Track listing

Charts

References

External links

1992 debut albums
3rd Bass albums
Def Jam Recordings albums
Albums recorded at Chung King Studios